Goodbye, Mr. Chips is a 1939 romantic drama film starring Robert Donat, Greer Garson and directed by Sam Wood. Based on the 1934 novella of the same name by James Hilton, the film is about Mr. Chipping, a beloved aged school teacher and former headmaster of a boarding school, who recalls his career and his personal life over the decades. Produced for the British division of MGM at Denham Studios, the film was dedicated to Irving Thalberg, who had died on 14 September 1936. At the 12th Academy Awards, it was nominated for seven awards, including Best Picture; and for his performance as Mr. Chipping, Donat won the award for Best Actor.

At the time of its release, the picture appeared on Film Dailys and the National Board of Review's ten best lists for 1939, and received the "best picture" distinction in The Hollywood Reporter Preview Poll of May 1939.

Plot
Due to a cold, retired schoolteacher Mr. Chipping misses a first-day assembly at Brookfield public school for the first time in 58 years. That afternoon, he falls asleep in his chair and his teaching career is related via flashback.

When 25-year-old Charles Edward Chipping first arrives as a Latin teacher in 1870, he becomes a target of practical jokes on his first day. He reacts by imposing strict discipline in his classroom, making him disliked but respected. Twenty years pass and he becomes the senior master. He is disappointed in not receiving an appointment as a housemaster within the school for the following year. However, the new German teacher, Max Staefel, saves him from despair by inviting him to share a walking holiday to his native Austria.

While mountain-climbing, Chipping encounters Kathy Ellis, a feisty English suffragette who is on a cycling holiday with a friend. They meet again in Vienna, where she persuades him to dance to the Blue Danube Waltz. (This piece of music is used as a leitmotif, symbolizing Chipping's love for her.) Staefel remarks that the Danube does not appear blue, but Chipping remarks it only appears so to those who are in love. On another part of the same boat, as Kathy looks at the river, she tells her friend that it is blue. Even though Kathy is considerably younger and livelier than Chipping, she loves and marries him. They return to England, where Kathy takes up residence at the school, charming everyone with her warmth.

During their tragically short marriage (she dies in childbirth, along with their baby), she brings "Chips" out of his shell and shows him how to be a better teacher. He acquires a flair for Latin puns. As the years pass, Chips becomes a much-loved school institution, developing a rapport with generations of pupils; he teaches the sons and grandsons of many of his earlier pupils.

In 1909, when he is pressured to retire by a more "modern" headmaster, the boys and the board of governors of the school take his side of the argument and tell him he can stay until he is 100, and that he is free to pronounce Cicero as SIS-er-ro, and not as KEE-kir-ro.

Chips finally retires in 1914 at the age of 69, saying, "Haec olim meminisse iuvabit" (One day, we'll look back on this and smile), but is summoned back to serve as interim headmaster because of the shortage of teachers resulting from the First World War. He remembers Kathy had predicted he would become headmaster one day. During a bombing attack by a German Zeppelin, Chips insists that the boys keep on translating their Latin, choosing the story of Julius Caesar's battles against Germanic tribes, which describes the latter's belligerent nature, much to the amusement of his pupils. As the Great War drags on, Chips reads aloud into the school's Roll of Honour every Sunday the names of the many former boys and teachers who have died in the war. Upon discovering that Max Staefel has died fighting on the German side, Chips reads out his name in chapel, too.

He retires permanently in 1918, but continues living nearby. He is on his deathbed in 1933 when he overhears his colleagues talking about him. He responds, "I thought I heard you say it was a pity—pity I never had any children. But you're wrong. I have! Thousands of them, thousands of them...and all...boys."

Time discrepancy
The film does not follow the same timeframe as the novel. In the book, Mr. Chipping is 22 when he arrives at Brookfield, with a birth year of 1848, and 85 when he dies, in 1933. His age when he first comes to Brookfield is not stated in the film, but the Franco-Prussian War is under way, which sets the date of his arrival in September 1870. He retires at age 69 in 1914, making his birth year 1845, so in the film he arrives at Brookfield in 1870 at age 24 or 25. He develops the cold and misses assembly—and dies soon afterwards—at age 83, which must be in 1928. This also fits with his 58-year record for attendance beginning on the day he arrived: 1870–1928. The evidence in the film that the year of his death is 1933 comes from Chips saying to a new pupil at the start of the film that he has not taught in 15 years. Likewise, he says to young Colley that he has been teaching for 63 years, meaning he would have arrived at age 20, which is impossible given his credentials.

Cast

Acknowledgements
The opening credits contain a card that reads: "To Sidney Franklin...For his contribution in the preparation of the production...Grateful acknowledgement,"

The opening credits also contain a dedication to Irving Thalberg, who died in September 1936. It reads:

"We wish to acknowledge here our gratitude to the late Irving Thalberg, whose inspiration illuminates the picture of Goodbye, Mr. Chips"— James Hilton, Victor Saville, Sam Wood, Sidney A. Franklin, R. C. Sherriff, Claudine West, Eric Maschwitz

The AFI Catalog reports that Thalberg purchased Goodbye, Mr. Chips from galley proofs; he originally assigned Sidney Franklin to direct. After Franklin became an M-G-M producer, Sam Wood replaced him as director.

Filming locations
The exteriors of the buildings of the fictional Brookfield School were shot at Repton School, an independent school (at the time of filming, for boys only), in the village of Repton in Derbyshire; whilst the interiors, school courtyards and annexes, including the supposedly exterior shots of the Austrian Tyrol Mountains, were filmed at Denham Film Studios near the village of Denham in Buckinghamshire. Around 300 boys from Repton School—as well as members of the faculty—stayed on during the school holidays so they could appear in the film.

Score
The lyrics to the Brookfield School song were written by Eric Maschwitz.

Richard Addinsell's score for the film was included on a CD of his work. The liner notes of the CD include the lyrics for the Brookfield School song, which is heard over the beginning cast credits as well as throughout the film itself. The lyrics in the body of the film are all but unintelligible, but per the notes, the lyrics are as follows:

Let the years pass but our hearts will remember,
Schooldays at Brookfield ended too soon.
Fight to the death in the mire of November,
Last wicket rattles on evenings in June,
Grey granite walls that were gay with our laughter,
Green of the fields where our feet used to roam.
We shall remember, whate’er may come after,
Brookfield our mother and Brookfield our home.

Box office
According to MGM records, the film earned $1,717,000 in the US and Canada and $1,535,000 elsewhere, resulting in a profit of $1,305,000.

Reception
In May 1939, The New York Times critic Frank S. Nugent  praised the film at length, particularly the adaptation and the performances of Donat and Garson, among others.

In December 1939, Variety summed up the film as "a charming, quaintly sophisticated account [from the novel Goodbye, Mr. Chips! by James Hilton] of the life of a schoolteacher, highlighted by a remarkably fine performance from Robert Donat . . . The character he etches creates a bloodstream for the picture that keeps it intensely alive.”

Legacy
The film was re-released in the United Kingdom in 1944 and again in 1954.

In 1999, Goodbye, Mr. Chips was voted the 72nd greatest British film ever in the British Film Institute Top 100 British films poll.

In 2003, the American Film Institute ranked Mr. Chipping the 41st greatest film hero of all time.

On TCM.com, Leonard Maltin gave the film 3.5 stars out of 4.

Academy Awards and nominations
The film was nominated for seven Academy Awards: for Outstanding Production, Best Director, Actor, Actress, Best Writing, Screenplay, Best Film Editing, and Best Sound. It was up against Gone with the Wind in all seven categories; Robert Donat won for Best Actor, beating Laurence Olivier, Clark Gable and James Stewart, though Goodbye, Mr. Chips lost to Gone With the Wind in five of the six remaining categories, while Mr. Smith Goes to Washington won Best Original Story. (Best Sound went to When Tomorrow Comes.)

1969 remake
Goodbye, Mr. Chips was remade as a musical in 1969, starring Peter O'Toole and Petula Clark. The James Hilton novel has also been adapted for television twice as serials in 1984 (starring Roy Marsden) and 2002 (starring Martin Clunes).

See also
 BFI Top 100 British films

Notes

External links

 
 
 
 
 
Streaming audio 
 Goodbye, Mr. Chips on Lux Radio Theater: 20 November 1939 
 Goodbye, Mr. Chips on Hallmark Playhouse: 16 September 1948 
 Goodbye, Mr. Chips on NBC University Theater: 9 July 1949

1939 films
British black-and-white films
British romantic drama films
Films shot at Denham Film Studios
Films based on British novels
Films directed by Sam Wood
Films featuring a Best Actor Academy Award-winning performance
Films set in England
Metro-Goldwyn-Mayer films
1939 romantic drama films
Films about educators
Films about teacher–student relationships
Films set in boarding schools
Films set in the 1870s
Films set in the 1900s
Films set in the 1910s
Films set in 1933
Films scored by Richard Addinsell
Films produced by Victor Saville
1930s high school films
1930s English-language films
1930s British films